Plymouth Argyle Football Club is an English association football club based in Plymouth, Devon. Founded in 1886 as Argyle Football Club, they became a professional club in January 1903, and were elected to the Southern League ahead of the 1903–04 season. The club won the Southern League championship in 1913 and finished as runners-up on two occasions, before being elected to the Football League in 1920, where they compete to this day, as a founder member of the Third Division. Argyle won their first Football League championship, and promotion to the Second Division for the first time, ten years later in 1930. As of May 2011, the club has won five championships in the Football League, gained promotion on eight occasions, and been relegated nine times. Four of those league championships were won in the third tier, which is a divisional record. Argyle have made one appearance at Wembley Stadium, in which they won the 1996 Third Division play-off final. The club has also achieved moderate success in domestic cup competitions; they reached the semi-finals of the FA Cup in 1984, and the quarter-finals in 2007. Argyle have also reached the semi-finals of the League Cup twice, in 1965 and 1974.

Since introducing professionalism, more than 900 players have made a competitive first team appearance for the club. All players who have featured in 100 or more such matches are listed below. The club's all-time appearance record is held by Kevin Hodges, who made 620 appearances for Argyle between 1978 and 1992. Nine other players have made at least 400 appearances for the club, with the two most recent being born and raised in Plymouth; Mickey Evans and Paul Wotton, with the latter being the club's most successful captain. The all-time goalscoring record is held by Sammy Black, who scored 184 times between 1924 and 1938. He is also second on the all-time appearance list, having played in 491 matches for Argyle. Four other players have scored at least 100 goals for the club, with the most recent being Tommy Tynan. As of 2010, Tony Capaldi is the club's most capped international player, having made 21 appearances for Northern Ireland during his Argyle career. Eight players have gone on to become the club's manager; including caretakers, 11 former players have held responsibility for first team selection. Rory Fallon is the only player listed who has represented his country at the World Cup while with the club. He scored the goal that secured New Zealand's place in the 2010 tournament, and played in all three of their matches in the group stage.

Table key

Players

Footnotes

A. : Players are listed according to the date of their first team debut.
B. : For a detailed description of playing positions, see Association football positions.
C. : Appearances and goals are sourced to Danes (2009), up to and including the 2008–09 season, and to Soccerbase as appropriate thereafter. Statistics from the abandoned 1939–40 season and subsequent wartime competitions, including the 1945–46 Football League season, are generally not included by football historians. Substitutions were introduced in 1965.
D. : Caps and goals at international level are sourced to Danes (2009), up to and including the 2008–09 season, and the relevant player reference thereafter. Caps earned during the players whole career are included, not just those won while contracted to Plymouth Argyle.
E. : Jack was the first player to sign a professional contract with the club.
F. : A player who later managed the club; including caretakers.
G. : Clark led the team to the Western League championship in the 1904–05 season.
H. : Scored four goals in one match.
I. : Wilcox led the team to the Southern League championship in the 1912–13 season.
J. : Holds club record for goals scored; second overall for appearances made.
K. : Titmuss captained the club to the Third Division South title in the 1929–30 season.
L. : Chisholm led the club to the Third Division South championship in the 1951–52 season.
M. : Carter shared captain duties with Len Casey, who joined the club mid-season, during the 1958–59 Third Division title winning campaign.
N. : Scored five goals in one match.
O. : The first winner of the Player of the Year award.
P. : Won the Player of the Year award twice.
Q. : Green captained the side to promotion from the Third Division in the 1974–75 season.
R. : Holds club record for appearances made; eighth overall for goals scored.
S.  Won the Player of the Year award three times.
T. : McElhinney led the club to promotion from the Third Division in the 1985–86 season.
U. : Heathcote captained the club to promotion from the Third Division via the play-offs in the 1995–96 season.
V. : Wotton led to the team to the Third Division championship in the 2001–02 season, and the Second Division championship in the 2003–04 season.
W. : Holds club record for international caps won while at the club.

References
General

Specific

External links
 
Plymouth Argyle F.C. archive

 
Players
Plymouth Argyle F.C.
Association football player non-biographical articles